The organic movement broadly refers to the organizations and individuals involved worldwide in the promotion of organic food and other organic products. It started during the first half of the 20th century, when modern large-scale agricultural practices began to appear.

Definition 
An organic product can broadly be described as not containing toxic chemicals (including synthetic pesticides, arsenic-containing herbicides, fertilization biosolids, chemical food additives, antibiotics, synthetic hormones, and industrial solvents). In addition to the absence of artificial chemicals, "organic" means not genetically engineered, and having not used ionizing irradiation, which can cause free-radicals and the removal of vitamins. For example, USDA organic restricts against such things, including genetic engineering in products or in the products' animal feed, and automatically allows the use of "Non-GMO" labelling similar to The Non-GMO Project.

In the United Kingdom, the term used with food is natural food.

History

Origin 
The organic movement began in the early 1900s in response to the shift towards synthetic nitrogen fertilizers and pesticides in the early days of industrial agriculture. A relatively small group of farmers came together in various associations: Demeter International of Germany, which encouraged biodynamic farming and began the first certification program, the Australian Organic Farming and Gardening Society, the Soil Association of the United Kingdom, and Rodale, Inc. in Emmaus, Pennsylvania, and others. In 1972, these organizations joined to form the International Federation of Organic Agriculture Movements (IFOAM). In recent years, environmental awareness has driven demand and conversion to organic farming. Some governments, including the European Union, have begun to support organic farming through agricultural subsidy reform. Organic production and marketing have grown at a fast pace.

Historians consider Albert Howard, Viscount Lymington, Robert McCarrison, Edgar J. Saxon and Frank Newman Turner as pioneers of the organic movement in Britain, and the term "organic farming" was coined by Lord Northbourne in 1940. 

Today, organic foods stores have captured a significant share of the grocery shopping market, specifically, Whole Foods Market, Wild Oats, Trader Joe's and others.

Timeline 
 In the summer of 1924 Rudolf Steiner presented what has been called the first organic agriculture course to a group of over one hundred farmers and others at Koberwitz, now Kobierzyce, Poland.[8] In Germany Rudolf Steiner's Spiritual Foundations for the Renewal of Agriculture, published in 1924, led to the popularization of biodynamic agriculture, probably the first comprehensive organic farming system, that was based on Steiner's spiritual and philosophical teachings.
 The first use of the term "organic farming" is by Lord Northbourne (aka Walter James, 4th Baron Northbourne). The term derives from his concept of "the farm as organism", which he expounded in his book, Look to the Land (1940), and in which he described a holistic, ecologically balanced approach to farming. Northbourne wrote of "chemical farming versus organic farming". http://www.orgprints.org/10138.
 In 1939, strongly influenced by Sir Howard's work, Lady Eve Balfour launched the Haughley Experiment on farmland in England. It was the first, side-by-side comparison of organic and conventional farming. Four years later, she published The Living Soil, based on the initial findings of the Haughley Experiment. It was widely read, and lead to the formation of a key international organic advocacy group, the Soil Association.
 Sir Albert Howard's 1940 book, An Agricultural Testament, was influential in promoting organic techniques, and his 1947 book "The Soil and Health, A Study of Organic Agriculture" adopted Northbourne's terminology and was the first book to include "organic" agriculture or farming in its title.
 During the 1950s, sustainable agriculture was a research topic of interest. The science tended to concentrate on the new chemical approaches. In the U.S. J. I. Rodale began to popularize the term and methods of organic growing. In addition to agricultural research, Rodale's publications through Rodale, Inc. in Emmaus, Pennsylvania helped to promote organic gardening to the general public.
 In 1962, Rachel Carson, a prominent scientist and naturalist, published Silent Spring, chronicling the effects of DDT and other pesticides on the environment drawing on the research of biodynamic agriculture advocates Marjorie Spock, Mary T. Richards and Ehrenfried Pfeiffer.[9] A bestseller in many countries, including the US, and widely read around the world, Silent Spring was instrumental in the US government's 1972 banning of DDT. The book and its author are often credited with launching the environmental movement.
 In the 1970s, worldwide movements concerned with environmental pollution caused by persistent agrichemical increased attention on organic farming. One goal of the organic movement was to promote consumption of locally grown food, which was promoted through slogans such as "Know Your Farmer, Know Your Food".
 In 1972, the International Federation of Organic Agriculture Movements (IFOAM), was founded in Versailles, France. IFOAM was dedicated to the diffusion of information on the principles and practices of organic agriculture across national and linguistic boundaries. In the same year, John Battendieri founded Santa Cruz Organics, which marketed some of the first packaged organic products.[10]
 In the 1980s, around the world, various farming and consumer groups began seriously pressuring for government regulation of organic production to ensure standards of production. This led to various legislation and certification standards being enacted through the 1990s and to date. Currently, most aspects of organic food production are government-regulated in the US and the European Union.
 In the 2000s, the worldwide market for organic products (including food, beauty, health, bodycare, and household products, and fabrics) has grown rapidly. More countries are establishing formal, government-regulated Organic certification. Monitoring and challenging certification rules and decisions have become a regular, high profile aspect of activists in the organic movement.

Organic food

Organic companies
The recent interest in the organic industry has sparked the interest of many businesses from small local distributors to large companies that distribute many products nationally. The organic market is now a 13 billion dollar a year industry, that continues to grow especially from large corporations such as Wal-Mart that are now offering organic choices to their customers. Other companies that offer organic options include General Mills and Kraft. Some large companies have bought smaller already established organic companies such as Earth's Best, Rice Dream soy milk, Garden of Eatin', Celestial Seasonings and Health Valley. When larger companies buy smaller companies it is called stealth ownership.

Organic cosmetics
Organic cosmetics are products that are made with organic ingredients that were produced without the use of synthetic pesticides, herbicides, fungicides, and fertilizers.

The FDA does not have a definition of "Organic" in terms of organic cosmetics. FDA regulates cosmetics under the authority of the Federal Food, Drug, and Cosmetic Act (FD&C Act) and the Fair Packaging and Labeling Act (FPLA).

The FDA does not have a definition of “Organic” in terms of organic cosmetics. FDA regulates cosmetics under the authority of the Federal Food, Drug, and Cosmetic Act  (FD&C Act) and the Fair Packaging and Labeling Act (FPLA).
The FDA does not have a definition of "Organic" in terms of organic cosmetics. FDA regulates cosmetics under the authority of the Federal Food, Drug, and Cosmetic Act (FD&C Act) and the Fair Packaging and Labeling Act (FPLA).

The USDA (the U.S. Department of Agriculture) requirements for the use of the term “organic” are separate from the laws and regulations that FDA applies for cosmetics. For more information on "organic" labeling for cosmetics, see the NOP publication, "Cosmetics, Body Care Products, and Personal Care Products." Cosmetic products labeled with “organic” must follow both USDA regulations and FDA regulations of organic claims for labeling and safety requirements for cosmetics.

The Agricultural Marketing Service of USDA supervises the National Organic Program (NOP). The NOP regulations have the definition of "organic" and provide certification for agricultural ingredients if they have been produced under conditions that would meet the definition. Moreover, the regulations also include labeling standards based on the percentage of organic ingredients in every product.

The COSMetic Organic and Natural Standard (COSMOS) sets certification requirements for organic and natural cosmetics products in Europe.

Organic farming

Organic land care and landscaping 
Organic land care, organic landscaping or organic lawn management is a form of horticulture that relies on organic land management techniques such as mowing high, proper watering, use of compost, soil amendments and organic pest control. 

In the late 20th century, a movement to manage lawns organically began to grow out of the practices of the organic farming movement. Activists in a number of U.S. cities have pushed local governments to require organic landscaping. Many private properties around the world are managed organically, but some locations require organic land care. Local regulations are often responding to a lack of regulation from the federal government and billion-dollar settlements against pesticide manufacturers.

The organic land care movement gained public recognition in 1996 when England's Prince Charles announced that the Highgrove House gardens and landscaping were under organic management. In 2009, then Harvard University President Drew Gilpin Faust announced that the campus and grounds were under organic management there implemented by landscape director Wayne Carbone and with savings of two million gallons of irrigation water and resulting in cure of leaf spot and apple scab in the campus orchard. In 2018, Portland, Maine became the largest city in the United States to restrict all synthetic pesticide applications across all public lands and private property. The pesticide ordinance passed by the City Council that includes a fine of up to $500 for violations was lobbied for by environmental groups and community organizer Avery Yale Kamila. In 2019, Rafael Tornini, head of the Garden and Environment Service of the Vatican, announced the 37 acre Gardens of Vatican City had been transitioning to organic management since 2017.

Criticisms
There have been multiple criticisms regarding organic food and organic marketing practices. Scientists at the University of Washington did a test of the urine of children who are on organic food diets and children who are on conventional food diets. The result was children on organic food diets ‘ urine had a median level of pesticide byproducts only one-sixth of children on conventional food diets. However, at the same time French, British and Swedish government food agencies have all concluded that there was no scientific proof that organic food is safer or has more nutrition than conventional foods.

A 2014 study by a non-profit academic think tank alleged consumers are "routinely deceived" by intentional and endemic misleading health claims in organic marketing. Organic products typically cost 10% to 40% more than similar conventionally produced products. According to the UK's Food Standards Agency, "Consumers may choose to buy organic fruit, vegetables and meat because they believe them to be more nutritious than other food. However, the balance of current scientific evidence does not support this view." A 12-month systematic review commissioned by the FSA in 2009 and conducted at the London School of Hygiene & Tropical Medicine based on 50 years' worth of collected evidence concluded that "there is no good evidence that consumption of organic food is beneficial to health in relation to nutrient content." Although the source of the organic movement was small family farms, large corporations have started distributing more organic products and certain categories of organic foods, such as milk, have been reported by Michael Pollan to be highly concentrated and predominantly sourced to mega-farms.

See also
 Organic certification
Organic horticulture
Organic lawn management
List of organic food topics
 List of organic gardening and farming topics
 Holistic management

Notes

References
 Kuepper, G. (2010). A Brief Overview of the History and Philosophy of Organic Agriculture
 Blythman, J. (2005). The Trouble with Organics. Academic Search Complete, 35(6), 24–25 h
 Miller. (2004). The Organic Myth. Ebscohost, Vol 56(2). 7–10.

External links
 – J. Paull, 2006, The Farm as Organism: The Foundational Idea of Organic Agriculture.
 – J. Paull, 2007, China's Organic Revolution.

Organic food
Organic gardening
Organic farming